Rogašovci (in older sources also Rogačovci) is a settlement in Slovenia. It is the seat of the Municipality of Rogašovci. It is part of the Prekmurje region.

References

External links

Rogašovci on Geopedia

Populated places in the Municipality of Rogašovci